The Strang Carriage House is a historical building and museum in Overland Park, Kansas.  It was originally constructed by William B. Strang Jr. for his carriages, automobiles and to serve as a residence for his driver.   The exterior of the building is constructed of rough limestone with a clay tile roof and still has the original doors from its construction (sometime around 1915).  

Since 1990, the structure serves as home to the Overland Park Historical Society and showcases a collection of items from the early history of Overland Park and the surrounding area. The location is considered suitable for enthusiasts to complete historical research.

Image gallery

References

External links
 Overland Park Historical Society official page

Museums in Johnson County, Kansas
Buildings and structures in Overland Park, Kansas
History museums in Kansas